Maharana Pratap Airport  is a domestic airport serving Udaipur, Rajasthan, India. It is situated at Dabok, located 22 km (14 mi) east of Udaipur. The airport is named after Maharana Pratap who was a Maharana (ruler) of the princely state of Mewar, in north-western India.

The airstrip was used for the first time when a 4-seater Piper Super Cub landed in the airport on 16 November 1957. The airport's new passenger terminal commenced operations in February 2008.

Structure

The airport is spread over 504 acres. It has one 2,743 metre-long runway. Its 250 by 150-metre apron provides parking space for five Boeing 737 and Airbus A320 type aircraft at a time. A new apron is also constructed on the left side of the existing apron for executive and private aircraft. The new terminal building, measuring 12,175 sq.m., was constructed at a cost of ₹ 80 crore. The terminal has two aerobridges, 4 check-in counters and can handle 600 passengers during peak hours.
The airport is equipped with modern navigational and landing aids like Distance Measuring Equipment (DME), DVOR, and Non-Directional Beacon (NDB) and is equipped with a CAT-I Instrument Landing System (ILS).

Airlines and destinations

Statistics

See also 
 Airports in India
 Udaipur
 Udaipur City Bus Depot
 Udaipur City railway station

References

External links

 Maharana Pratap Airport at Airports Authority of India

Airports in Rajasthan
Buildings and structures in Udaipur
Transport in Udaipur
Memorials to Maharana Pratap
Airports established in 1957
20th-century architecture in India